Zenon Taverna is a restaurant serving Greek and Cypriot cuisine on 31st Avenue in Astoria, Queens, in the U.S. state of New York.

History
The restaurant launched an online cooking series in February 2021.

Reception
Eater New York Alexandra Ilyashov included Zenon in her 2018 list of "Where to Feast on Greek Food in NYC". The website's Robert Sietsema included the restaurant in his 2020 list of "10 Great Seafood Dishes Still Available in NYC".

See also

 List of Greek restaurants

References

External links
 

Astoria, Queens
Cypriot American
Cypriot cuisine
Greek-American cuisine
Greek-American culture in New York City
Restaurants in New York City
Greek restaurants in the United States